Imre Boda (born 10 October 1961) is a retired Hungarian international footballer, who played as a forward.

Club career
Boda began playing youth football with MTK Budapest FC. He would join the senior team in 1980, and make 190 league appearances for the club. A short spell with Vasas SC followed.

Boda moved to Greece in July 1988, initially joining Greek first division side Ethnikos Olympiakos Volos F.C. for two seasons. He would lead the Greek league in goal-scoring, notching 20 goals during the 1988–89 season. Olympiakos Volos were relegated after the 1989–90 season, and Boda moved to OFI Crete for two seasons. However, he left the club in December 1991, and would return to Olympiakos Volos, now playing in the Greek second division.

After five seasons in Greek football, Boda returned to Hungary and joined BVSC Budapest for one season, playing his last match in October 1993.

International career
Boda made eight appearances for the Hungary national football team, including two 1990 FIFA World Cup qualifying matches.

References

External links

1961 births
Living people
Hungarian footballers
Hungary international footballers
Nemzeti Bajnokság I players
Super League Greece players
MTK Budapest FC players
Vasas SC players
Budapesti VSC footballers
Olympiacos Volos F.C. players
OFI Crete F.C. players
Association football forwards
Hungarian expatriate footballers
Expatriate footballers in Greece
People from Szolnok
Sportspeople from Jász-Nagykun-Szolnok County